Flint County may refer to:

 A fictional location in the game Grand Theft Auto: San Andreas
 The County of Flint, an historic county of Wales
 Flint Boroughs a former UK Parliament constituency